The Church of San Nicolás de Soria (Spanish: Iglesia de San Nicolás) is now only ruined remnants of a Romanesque-style, Roman Catholic, former church located in Soria, Spain. It was declared Bien de Interés Cultural in 1962.

Part of the apse and some side walls remain: in 1858, the nave roof was brought down. In 1908, the portal of the church was moved to the church of San Juan de Rabanera in Soria. Finally in 1933 further unstable walls were razed. In 1978, during some restoration works, frescoes depicting the murder of Saint Thomas of Canterbury were discovered in one of the remaining walls of the church.

References 

Bien de Interés Cultural landmarks in the Province of Soria
Church ruins in Spain
13th-century Roman Catholic church buildings in Spain
Romanesque architecture in Castile and León
Roman Catholic churches in Soria